Campterophlebia is an extinct genus of prehistoric dragonflies in the family Campterophlebiidae. The species C. elegans is from the Jurassic (Lower Toarcian) Posidonia Shale of Germany. It is the largest Early Jurassic flying insect, with a wing over 7.31 cm length and 1.73 cm width.

References

External links 

 
 
 Campterophlebia at insectoid.info

Prehistoric Odonata genera
Anisoptera genera
Fossils of Germany
Posidonia Shale